John Pezak (October 25, 1913 – June 7, 1998) was a Democratic member of the Pennsylvania House of Representatives.

References

Democratic Party members of the Pennsylvania House of Representatives
1913 births
1998 deaths
20th-century American politicians